Louise Adams  is a Chartered Civil Engineer and  Aurecon's chief operating officer. In 2020, Adams was awarded Australian CEO of the Year by The CEO Magazine. Previously she served as the Chief Executive for Australia and New Zealand at Aurecon, overseeing a workforce of 4300 people. In 2013, Adams became the first woman to serve as executive director on Aurecon's Global Board. Adams has worked as a civil engineer for over 20 years.

In 2021, Adams was recognised as a Deakin University Alumni of the Year. Adams is a graduate of the Wharton Business School, through the 2018 Chief Executive Women Scholarship. In November 2021, she was elected a fellow of the Australian Academy of Technology and Engineering.

References 

Living people
Year of birth missing (living people)
Fellows of the Australian Academy of Technological Sciences and Engineering
Australian civil engineers